Alfred Charles "A. J." Bowen Jr. (born December 21, 1977) is an American actor and producer. He starred in The Signal (2007) and A Horrible Way To Die (2010).

Early life
Bowen was born in Marietta, Georgia, and attended the University of Georgia along with Jacob Gentry and David Bruckner.  He was initially a musician.

Career
LA Weekly called Bowen "mumblegore's go-to star". He starred in The Signal (2007) and The House of the Devil (2009). The first feature from his production company, Normaltown, was Maidenhead, in which he stars. He also starred in Hatchet II (2010). He was part of the Christmas episode of Dread Central's Dinner for Friends ("Shark Alarm 2009", the holiday edition of the site's podcast). He also starred in the thriller film Rites of Spring. He starred in the science fiction film Synchronicity. He co-starred in the film You're Next (2011) and appeared in The Reconstruction of William Zero (2014).

Filmography

References

External links
 

Male actors from Georgia (U.S. state)
American male film actors
Living people
People from Marietta, Georgia
21st-century American male actors
1977 births